The Sokolsky Opening (also known as the Orangutan or  Polish Opening) is an uncommon chess opening that begins with the move:

1. b4

According to various databases, out of the twenty possible first moves from White, the move 1.b4 ranks ninth in popularity. It is considered an irregular opening, so it is classified under the A00 code in the Encyclopaedia of Chess Openings (ECO).

Details
The opening has never been popular at the top level, though a number of prominent players have employed it on occasion (for example, Richard Réti against Abraham Speijer in Scheveningen 1923 and Boris Spassky against Vasily Smyslov in the 1960 Moscow–Leningrad match). Soviet player Alexei Pavlovich Sokolsky (1908–1969) wrote a monograph on this opening in 1963, Debyut 1 b2–b4. In May 2021, world champion Magnus Carlsen essayed the opening against GMs Hikaru Nakamura and Wesley So in the online FTX Crypto Cup rapid tournament.

Perhaps its most famous use came in the game Tartakower versus Maróczy, in the New York 1924 chess tournament on March 21, 1924. The name "Orangutan Opening" originates from that game: the players visited the Bronx Zoo the previous day, where Tartakower consulted an orangutan named Susan, and she somehow indicated, Tartakower insisted, that he should open with b4.  Also, Tartakower noted that the climbing movement of the pawn to b5 reminded him of the orangutan.  In that particular game, Tartakower came out of the opening with a decent position, but the game was drawn. Alekhine, who played in the tournament and wrote a book on it, said that 1.b4 was an old move, and that the problem is that it reveals White's intentions, before White knows what Black's intentions are.

Less ambitious moves like 1...Nf6, 1...c6 (called the Outflank Variation, preparing ...Qb6 or ...a5), and 1...e6 are also reasonable. Rarer attempts have been made with 1...a5 or 1...c5. Black's reply 1...e6 is usually followed by ...d5, ...Nf6 and an eventual ...c5. After 1...a5 White will most likely play 2.b5 and take advantage of Black's queenside weakness. Black's 1...c5 is much sharper and more aggressive and is normally used to avoid theory. After the capture Black will generally place pressure on the c5-square and will develop an attack against White's weak queenside structure at the cost of an inferior central position.

See also
 List of chess openings
 List of chess openings named after people

Named variations
 1…b5 (Symmetrical Variation)
 2.a4 (Queen’s Knight’s Gambit)
 1...c5 (Birmingham Gambit)
 1...c6 (Outflank Variation)
 1...c6 2.Bb2 a5 3.b5 cxb5 4.e4 (Schuhler Gambit)
 1...d5 2.Bb2 c6 3.a4 (Myers Variation)
 1...d5 2.Bb2 Qd6 3.a3 e5 4.Nf3 e4 5.Nd4 Nf6 6.c4! dxc4 7.e3 Be7 8.Bxc4 O-O 9.Nc3 (German Defense)
 1...e5 2.a3 (Bugayev Attack)
 1...e5 2.Bb2 c5 (Wolferts Gambit)
 1...e5 2.Bb2 f6 3.e4 Bxb4 (Tartakower Gambit)
 1...e5 2.Bb2 f6 3.e4 Bxb4 4.Bc4 Nc6 5.f4 Qe7 6.f5 g6 (Brinckmann Variation)
 1...Na6 (Bucker Defense Kingsley Variation)
 1...Nc6 (Grigorian Variation)
 1...Nf6 2.Bb2 g6 3.g4 (Polish Spike)
 1...Nh6 (Karniewski Variation)

References

Bibliography

Konikowski, Jerzy; Soszynski, Marek: The Sokolsky Opening 1.b4 in Theory & Practice. Russell Enterprises, Milford USA 2009,

External links

 1. b4 variations and games by Marek Trokenheim (Marek's 1.b4 Encyclopaedia)
 "The Chess Moves 1 b4 and 1...b5" by Edward Winter
 Sokolsky a web site dedicated to the Sokolsky opening 

Chess openings
1924 in chess
1963 in chess